Luigi "Louis" Piazzoni (May 1846 – December 20, 1925), was a Swiss-born immigrant who came to upper Carmel Valley, California in the 1870s. He was a successful farmer for 50 years. The legacy of the Piazzoni family lives on with the Piazzoni ranch as one of the oldest working ranches in Carmel Valley, the Piazzoni cowboys and cowgirls, and Luigi's nephew, painter Gottardo Piazzoni, with three generations that painted the hills of California.

Early life 

Luigi Piazzoni was born in May 1846, in a village of Intragna, Ticino, Switzerland. His parents were Swiss-Italian, Fedele Piazzoni (b. 1802) and Giovanna Baccala. Luigi and his brothers, Paolo (b. 1832), Filippo, and Federico, left Switzerland to prospect for gold in Australia at the time of the California Gold Rush.

Professional life

Piazzoni Ranch

The Piazzoni brothers came to Salinas, California in the 1870s and worked as wood cutters. The ranch was originally part of Rancho Tularcitos. They built a dairy barn with 200 head of cows. They called the ranch Los Chupines, in Spanish, it means "the lollipops." The ranch produced milk and cheese and sold Swiss cheese to the Monterey restaurants and the Airway Market in Carmel Valley Village.

 
In September 1882, Luigi married Tomasa Fiesta Manjarres, who was Rumsen-Esselen, Ohlone Native American in Monterey, California. They had nine children together: one son, Louie William, and eight daughters, Jennie (Wilson), Irene (unmarried), Edith Rose (Escobar), Helen Blanche (Cordero), Alice Thelma (Varien), Henrietta (Nason), Marion (Van de Bogart), and Florence (Forzani). He also had two daughters from another relationship all born and raised on the Piazzoni Ranch. Tomasa was baptized at Mission San Carlos in Carmel in 1862. She was the daughter of Miguel Manuel Manjarres, a Spaniard whose ancestors emmigrated to Alta California and Agueda Maria de Jesus Mucjai, who was full Rumsen-Esselen Indian from the village of Tukutnut in Monterey County Valley and from the village of Sargentaruc in Big Sur. Tomasa was the niece of Ponciano Manjares, who married 18 year-old Maria Manuela Paula Boronda. 

The Piazzoni daughters Helen, Alice, Irene, and Edith participated in rodeos, in Salinas during the 1910s and 1920s, in steer riding, cowgirl roping, and racing. Their daughter, Alice Piazzoni, married Charles A. Varien. She was an early Salinas ambassador of the rodeo. She also worked in the canneries on Monterey’s Cannery Row. She moved to Arkansas, where she died on November 7, 1990. Daughter Helen Piazzoni was a good horse women and participated in rodeos in Salinas. Daughter Irene was a rancher and horsewoman, roade in every parade for 60 years, and was a honored guest at the Monterey County Fair in 1983. Daughter Florence was the mother of Roy Forzani who was a cowboy and played football. Daughter Henrietta married Paul Watson Nason on February 8, 1908, in Salinas.

Gottardo Fidele Piazzoni

Luigi Piazzoni's brother, Paolo Piazzoni, had a second Piazzoni ranch along Chupinas Creek that crosses east Carmel Valley Road. His son,  Gottardo Fidele Piazzoni, was a landscape painter, muralist and sculptor and member of the school of Northern California artists in the early 1900s. At age 15 (1887) he moved to his father's dairy farm in the Carmel Valley. He went on to study art at the California School of Design, now the San Francisco Art Institute. This valley inspired his artwork throughout his life. He became friends with Clark Hobart an American painter; Arthur Putnam, a sculptor and animalier; Granville Redmond, a landscape painter; and Ralph Stackpole, a sculptor, painter, muralist, etcher, and art educator.

Gottardo married Beatrice Delmue on December 7, 1905, and had two daughters, Romy Charlotte and Mireille Beatrice. Mireille became a landscape painter and married painter-writer Philip R. Wood. Thy both went to the California School of Fine Art (now San Francisco Art Institute). They had to sons, Thomas Wood  and Jon. Romy married Russell Wilson Chattham. They had a son, Russell D. Chattham who became a landscape artist and author, and Arthur R., Beatrice M., and Elizabeth.

Gottardo Piazzoni died on August 1, 1945, at the Piazzoni ranch home in Carmel Valley. Services were held in San Francisco. Piazzoni was buried at the Cypress Lawn Memorial Park cemetery, in Colma, California.

Death

Piazzoni died at his home on December 20, 1925, in Carmel Valley, California, at the age of 79. His funeral took place from Freeman's undertaking parlors in Monterey. He is buried at the Piazzoni family plot in San Carolos Cemetery in Monterey.

Piazzoni ranches
The Luigi Piazzoni ranch is still in the family and is being used to raise grass feed beef. The ranch was passed to Irene (unmarried) Piazzoni who in turn passed it on to her sister, Florence Forzani's grandson, Dean Forzani and children. Dean has maintained the original ranch house, which is over 100 years old.

A second Paolo Piazzoni ranch, settled in the 1870s, passed to Gottardo Piazzoni and then to his grandchildren, Thomas Wood and Russell Chattham. This ranch was in a deep canyon, four miles from the main road, between Carmel Valley and Jamesburg, California. The dairy and tool house had sculpture stands and woodcarvings by artist Roy Nolan, who once lived on their ranch. The closest neighbors were Irene and Louie Piazzoni, several miles away. 

A third  Piazzoni Ranch was owned by Luigi and his brother Filippo who passed it down to his son Leo. This ranch was next to the Luigi Piazzoni ranch. Leo willed his ranch to the State of California that was eventually sold to other ranchers.

Legacy

{{Quote box
|bgcolor=#CCDDFF
| width = 40em
| align = left
| quote =They climbed stiffly from their seats and stood on the ridge peak and looked down into the Pastures of Heaven. And the air was as golden gauze in the last of the sun. The land below them was plotted in squares of green orchard trees and in squares of yellow grain and in squares of violet earth. From the sturdy farmhouses, set in their gardens, the smoke of the evening fires drifted upward until the hillbreeze swept it cleanly off. Cowbells were softly clashing in the valley; a dog barked so far away that the sound rose up to the travelers in sharp little whispers. Directly below the ridge a band of sheep had gathered under an oak tree against the night.
"It's called Las Pasturas del Cielo," the driver said. "They raise good vegetables there good berries and fruit earlier here than any place else. The name means Pastures of Heaven."
|salign = left|source=— John Steinbeck}}

The Piazzoni name remains strong today in the Piazzoni ranch and in the history of the Piazzoni cowboys and cowgirls of Carmel Valley. Three generations of Gottardo Piazzoni's were painters of California landscapes.

John Steinbeck characterized Carmel Valley and land around the Piazzoni ranch in his 1995 book, The Pastures of Heaven.''

See also
 Timeline of Carmel-by-the-Sea, California

References

External links

Carmel Valley Historical Society

1846 births
1925 deaths
Swiss emigrants to the United States
People from Carmel Valley, California